Psarskie may refer to the following places in Poland:
Psarskie, a neighbourhood near Kiekrz in the Jeżyce district of Poznań
Psarskie, Szamotuły County
Psarskie, Śrem County